Winterheim is a fantasy novel by Douglas Niles, set in the world of Dragonlance, and based on the Dungeons & Dragons role-playing game. It is the third novel in the "Icewall" trilogy. It was published in paperback in January 2003.

Plot summary
Strongwind Whalebone, king of the Highlanders, has been imprisoned in the ogre fortress, while ogre king Grimwar Bane faces royal treachery and desperate revolt.

Reception
Reviewer Don D'Ammassa wrote that, especially compared to Niles' other novels, the story is "a bit too simplistic and routine."

References

2003 novels
Dragonlance novels